Atlantic Hill is an unincorporated community in Mineral County, West Virginia, United States.

Unincorporated communities in Mineral County, West Virginia
Unincorporated communities in West Virginia